Mammillaria anniana is a species of plant in the family Cactaceae. It is endemic to Tamaulipas state of northeastern Mexico.  Its natural habitat is hot deserts. It is a Critically endangered species, threatened by habitat loss.

References

anniana
Cacti of Mexico
Endemic flora of Mexico
Flora of Tamaulipas
Critically endangered plants
Endangered biota of Mexico
Taxonomy articles created by Polbot